The Virginia Community College System (VCCS) oversees a network of 23 community colleges in Virginia, which serve residents of Virginia and provide two-year degrees and various specialty training and certifications. In 2006, the Virginia Community College System's annual enrollment rate topped 233,000 students. The VCCS also had an additional 170,000 students in workforce development services and noncredit courses.

In March 2022, the system hired Russell Kavalhuna as its next chancellor.

In June 2022, the board announced that Kavalhuna was no longer taking the job and the system was restarting the search for a new chancellor. Sharon Morrissey, previously the system's  vice chancellor for academic and workforce programs, was appointed interim chancellor.

Colleges

References

External links
Virginia Community College System home page

 
 
Public university systems in the United States